The Madonna and Child is an early tempera on panel painting usually attributed to Giovanni Bellini, dated to 1450–1460 or to 1450–1455 by Pignatti, though Olivari and others consider this to be too early. In the 1450s the painter was still heavily influenced by his father Jacopo and by Bartolomeo Vivarini. The strong line used for the Christ Child also shows the influence of Francesco Squarcione and his studio on the young Bellini. The general composition is based on a widely copied Byzantine icon in Venice, whilst the Christ Child holds a Flemish-style scroll bearing the artist's signature. The painting is closely linked to a similar work now in Philadelphia. It is now in the Pinacoteca Malaspina in Pavia.

References and notes

1450s paintings
1460s paintings
Pavia